Konstantinos "Kostas" Fliskas (born 21 April 1980) is a Greek former professional footballer who played as a centre-back.

Career
Born in Karditsa, Fliskas began playing professional football with Anagennisi Karditsa F.C. in the Gamma Ethniki. In the summer of 2005, he signed with Super League side Xanthi where he played till 2019.

References

External links
Profile at epae.org
Profile at Onsports.gr

1982 births
Living people
Greek footballers
Super League Greece players
Anagennisi Karditsa F.C. players
Xanthi F.C. players
Association football central defenders
Footballers from Karditsa